Huichuan District is a district of the city of Zunyi, Guizhou, China. The Huichuan Sports Center is located in the district.

External links

County-level divisions of Guizhou
Zunyi